David Davenport (born c. 1950) is an American academic administrator. He served as the president of Pepperdine University from 1985 to 2000.

Early life
Davenport was born around 1950 in Kansas. A graduate of Stanford University, he earned a J.D. degree from the University of Kansas School of Law.

Career
Davenport began his career as a lawyer in San Diego, California. He later became a minister of the Churches of Christ.

Davenport joined the faculty of the Pepperdine University School of Law in 1980. He served as the president of Pepperdine University from 1985 to 2000. According to The Los Angeles Times, "Pepperdine's enrollment grew by about 15% to more than 7,800, while its endowment more than quintupled, from about $56 million in 1985 to more than $310 million" during the course of his presidency. He was succeeded by Andrew K. Benton.

Davenport is a research fellow at the Hoover Institution, a think tank at Stanford University.

Personal life
With his wife Sally, Davenport has three children.

References

1950s births
Living people
Stanford University alumni
University of Kansas School of Law alumni
Presidents of Pepperdine University
Hoover Institution people